Wes Patten (born 17 February 1974) is an Australian former professional rugby league footballer who played in the 1990s and 2000s. He played for the Balmain Tigers, Gold Coast Chargers, South Sydney Rabbitohs and the St. George Illawarra Dragons. Patten primarily played at half-back.

Playing career
Patten made his first-grade debut for Balmain in Round 22 of the 1993 NSWRL season against Parramatta.  In 1995, Balmain changed their name to the "Sydney Tigers" at the start of the Super League war and moved their home games to Parramatta Stadium.  Patten became a regular starter for the team in 1996, before departing at the end of the season to join the Gold Coast Chargers.

In his first year at the Gold Coast, Patten played 24 matches as the club reached its first-ever finals series.  Patten played in both finals games, a 25–14 victory over Illawarra and a 32–10 loss against the Sydney City Roosters.

The following year, Patten played in the Chargers’ final ever game as a club, a 20–18 loss against Cronulla-Sutherland. In 1999, Patten joined South Sydney and played in the club's final season in the league before they were controversially excluded from the competition. In 2000, Patten joined St George-Illawarra and played one season with them before retiring at the end of the season at the age of 26.

Post playing
Patten now works as a reporter and sideline host for the Barefoot Rugby League Show on National Indigenous Television (NITV). Prior to this, he guested in Australian soap opera Home and Away in 1993 as student Kevin Baker and also acted in the Australian television show Heartland.
 
Patten was allegedly involved in a home invasion but was acquitted. He is the cousin of Anthony Mundine.

References

Sources
 Whiticker, Alan and Hudson, Glen; The Encyclopedia of Rugby League Players; published 2005 by BAS publishing, f16/171 Collins St, Melbourne, Vic., 3000

1974 births
Living people
Indigenous Australian rugby league players
Australian rugby league players
Balmain Tigers players
Gold Coast Chargers players
South Sydney Rabbitohs players
St. George Illawarra Dragons players
Newcastle Yowies players
Australian male television actors
Indigenous Australian actors
Rugby league halfbacks
Rugby league players from Taree